The 6th NKP Salve Challenger Trophy was an Indian domestic cricket tournament that was held in Ahmedabad from 10 February to 13 February 2000. The series involved the domestic and national players from India who were allocated in India Seniors, India A, and India B. India Seniors defeated India A by 84 runs in the final to become the champions of the tournament.

Squads

Points Table

Matches

Group stage

Final

References

Indian domestic cricket competitions